The Rwandan Socialist Party (PSR) is a pro-government political party in Rwanda.

History
The party was founded on 18 August 1991. It joined the Rwandan Patriotic Front-led coalition for the 2003 parliamentary elections, winning a single seat. It remained part of the coalition for the 2008 and 2013 elections, retaining its one seat on both occasions. However, it lost its representation in parliament in the 2018 parliamentary elections.

References

Political parties in Rwanda
Political parties established in 1991
Socialist parties in Africa
1991 establishments in Rwanda